The Doctor of Social Science (DSocSci, SScD or DSS) degree is the highest degree offered by some universities in the field of social sciences, for which other universities confer a Ph.D.

Like the PhD, it is recognized as a terminal research degree that requires a substantial original thesis.

In North America, the only universities to offer a Doctor of Social Science are Royal Roads University in British Columbia, Canada, and Wilmington University in New Castle, Delaware, United States.

Argentina
Provided by the National University of Luján

Australia
Provided by the University of Queensland

Provided by the University of Sydney

Canada
Provided by Royal Roads University

Finland 
Provided by the University of Tampere

Holy See 
Provided by the Pontifical Gregorian University.

Hong Kong 
Provided by the University of Hong Kong.

Ireland 
The DSocSci is offered as a full-time qualification by:
University College Cork
Maynooth University

United States 
Formerly Offered by The New School for Social Research, but abolished
Wilmington University, New Castle,   Delaware

United Kingdom
The DSocSci is offered as a full-time or part-time qualification by:

Formerly offered by the University of Bristol, but abolished.
The University of Leicester
The Queen's University Belfast

References

Doctoral degrees
Social sciences